This is a list of awards, decorations, honours, orders and titles belonging to Mary of Teck, queen consort of the United Kingdom. Where two dates are listed, then the first indicates the date of the attaining of the award or title, and the second indicates the date of its loss.

Royal and noble titles and styles
26 May 1867 – 6 July 1893: Her Serene Highness Princess Victoria Mary of Teck
6 July 1893 – 22 January 1901: Her Royal Highness The Duchess of York
22 January 1901 – 9 November 1901: Her Royal Highness The Duchess of Cornwall and York
9 November 1901 – 6 May 1910: Her Royal Highness The Princess of Wales
6 May 1910 – 20 January 1936: Her Majesty The Queen
6 May 1910 - 20 January 1936: Her Imperial Majesty the Empress (In India)
20 January 1936 – 24 March 1953: Her Majesty Queen Mary

Other
 20 October 1919: Ga-no-ron-gwa ("She Loves") of the Iroquois Confederacy

British and Commonwealth honours

Foreign honours

Honorary military positions

Honorary civil appointments
Degrees

Freedom of the city

Honorific eponyms

Structures

Roads, highways, and bridges
 : Queensway Tunnel, between Liverpool and Birkenhead
 : Queen Mary Road, in Montreal, Quebec, Canada

Ships
HMS Queen Mary (1913): Royal Navy battlecruiser
TS Queen Mary (1933): Clyde steamer
RMS Queen Mary (1936): Cunard-White Star liner
RMS Queen Mary 2 (2003): Cunard ocean liner

See also
 List of titles and honours of Elizabeth II
 List of titles and honours of Prince Philip, Duke of Edinburgh
 List of titles and honours of Charles III
 List of titles and honours of Queen Camilla
 List of titles and honours of William, Prince of Wales
 List of titles and honours of Anne, Princess Royal
 List of titles and honours of Queen Elizabeth The Queen Mother
 List of titles and honours of George VI
 List of titles and honours of Prince Arthur, Duke of Connaught and Strathearn

References

Mary of Teck, titles
Mary of Teck
Mary of Teck, Titles and honours
Mary of Teck